The  is an AC electric multiple unit (EMU) train type operated by Hokkaido Railway Company (JR Hokkaido) on Super Kamui and Suzuran limited express services in Hokkaido, Japan, since 1990.

Design
The trains were built jointly by Hitachi and Kawasaki Heavy Industries.

Formations

Sets NE 1–5

Cars 2 and 4 are each fitted with one N-PS785S single-arm pantograph.

Sets NE 501–502

Cars 2 and 5 are each fitted with one N-PS785S single-arm pantograph.

Original 2+4-car sets

(1990–2002)

Cars 3 and 5 were each fitted with one N-PS721B scissors-type pantograph.

785-300 series Super Hakuchō set NE303
2-car set converted from former stored cars for use on Super Hakuchō services from December 2010

Interior
The 785 series trainsets do not include Green class (first class) accommodation, but car 4 is designated as a "u-Seat" car with improved seating for reserved seat passengers. All other cars are normally designated as non-reserved seating.

History

30 vehicles were delivered in 1990, formed as five 2-car (NE 101–105) and five 4-car (NE 1–5) sets. Sets were also used on some Lilac services.

From 18 February 2002, the original 4- and 2-car sets were reformed with the addition of newly built MoHa 784-500 and MoHa 785-500 cars to create a fleet of seven 5-car sets and one spare 2-car set, which was kept in storage. The control equipment from the cabs of cars within sets was removed between 2007 and 2008.

The spare 2-car set, NE 105, stored out of use since 2002 was modified in 2010 and repainted with green cab ends for use in conjunction with 789 series sets on Super Hakuchō services from the start of the revised timetable on 4 December 2010. This set has a maximum speed of 140 km/h.

References

External links

 JR Hokkaido 785/789 series Super Kamui 
 JR Hokkaido 785/789 series Suzuran 
 JR Hokkaido 785-300 series (Japan Railfan Magazine) 

Electric multiple units of Japan
Hokkaido Railway Company
Train-related introductions in 1990
Hitachi multiple units
20 kV AC multiple units
Kawasaki multiple units